William Smalley (1864–1912) was an English footballer who played in the Football League for Stoke.

Career
Smalley was born in Darwen and was on the books of Preston North End's reserve team but had not played for the first–team. When Stoke went to Deepdale, the home of Preston North End on 6 October 1888 they were missing two players who failed to board the train the morning so Preston lent them Smalley and fellow reserve team player Alfred Dempsey. The visitors were overwhelmed in a 7–0 defeat and Smalley never played first–team football again. Smalley' brother Robert Smalley played in goal for Everton.

Career statistics

References

English footballers
Preston North End F.C. players
Stoke City F.C. players
English Football League players
1864 births
1912 deaths
Association football forwards